Pamarru is a village in Konaseema district in the state of Andhra Pradesh in India.

References

Villages in Konaseema district